Look Me in the Eye is a 2007 book by John Elder Robison

Look Me in the Eye also refers to:

 Look Me in the Eye, a 1996 episode of Screen Two, written and directed by Nick Ward
Look Me In The Eye (TV series), an Australian reality series
Look Me in the Eye: Women, Aging and Ageism, a 1983 book by Barbara Macdonald

See also 
 Look into My Eyes (disambiguation)
 "When You Look Me in the Eyes", a 2007 song by the Jonas Brothers
 When I Look in Your Eyes, a 1999 album by Diana Krall
 "When I Look Into Your Eyes", a 1992 song by FireHouse
 Eye contact